Sheridan County is a county in the U.S. state of Montana. As of the 2020 census, the population was 3,539. Its county seat is Plentywood. Its northern boundary is the Canada–United States border south of Saskatchewan.

History
The Montana Legislature established Sheridan County in 1913 from portions of Dawson and Valley Counties. It was named for American Civil War General Philip Sheridan. In the 1920s and 1930s the county was a hotbed of communist organizing. The CPUSA managed to elect several town and county officials. At the 1932 presidential election the communist candidate William Z. Foster got 576 votes (22%). International changes in communist organizing strategies, especially the move towards the popular front, effectively ended communist presence in the area.

Geography

Major highways
  Montana Highway 5
  Montana Highway 16

Adjacent counties and rural municipalities

 Rural Municipality of Happy Valley, Saskatchewan - northwest
 Rural Municipality of Surprise Valley, Saskatchewan - north
 Rural Municipality of Lake Alma, Saskatchewan - northeast
 Daniels County - west
 Divide County, North Dakota - east
 Williams County, North Dakota - east
 Roosevelt County - south

National protected area
 Medicine Lake National Wildlife Refuge (part)

Demographics

2000 census
As of the 2000 United States census, there were 4,105 people, 1,741 households, and 1,140 families living in the county. The population density was 2.4 people per square mile (0.9/km2). There were 2,167 housing units at an average density of 1.3 per square mile (0.5/km2). The racial makeup of the county was 97.00% White, 0.10% Black or African American, 1.22% Native American, 0.29% Asian, 0.02% Pacific Islander, 0.19% from other races, and 1.17% from two or more races. 1.07% of the population were Hispanic or Latino of any race. 35.5% were of Norwegian, 19.0% German and 8.9% Danish ancestry.

There were 1,741 households, out of which 27.00% had children under the age of 18 living with them, 57.50% were married couples living together, 4.80% had a female householder with no husband present, and 34.50% were non-families. 32.30% of all households were made up of individuals, and 16.60% had someone living alone who was 65 years of age or older.  The average household size was 2.29 and the average family size was 2.87.

The county population contained 22.90% under the age of 18, 4.80% from 18 to 24, 22.20% from 25 to 44, 26.50% from 45 to 64, and 23.60% who were 65 years of age or older. The median age was 45 years. For every 100 females there were 98.70 males. For every 100 females age 18 and over, there were 96.80 males.

The median income for a household in the county was $29,518, and the median income for a family was $35,345. Males had a median income of $23,053 versus $20,112 for females. The per capita income for the county was $16,038. About 10.60% of families and 14.70% of the population were below the poverty line, including 16.40% of those under age 18 and 15.80% of those age 65 or over.

2010 census
As of the 2010 United States census, there were 3,384 people, 1,587 households, and 944 families living in the county. The racial makeup of the county was 95.4% white, 1.7% American Indian, 0.4% Asian, 0.2% black or African American, 0.3% from other races, and 2.0% from two or more races. Those of Hispanic or Latino origin made up 1.5% of the population. In terms of ancestry, 33.8% were Norwegian, 26.0% were German, 12.0% were Danish, 11.6% were Irish, 5.5% were Swedish, 5.3% were English, and 5.0% were American.

Of the 1,587 households, 21.3% had children under the age of 18 living with them, 49.5% were married couples living together, 5.7% had a female householder with no husband present, 40.5% were non-families, and 37.1% of all households were made up of individuals. The average household size was 2.08 and the average family size was 2.70. The median age was 50.3 years.

The median income for a household in the county was $39,578 and the median income for a family was $55,313. Males had a median income of $46,932 versus $22,107 for females. The per capita income for the county was $26,537. About 6.4% of families and 14.5% of the population were below the poverty line, including 8.8% of those under age 18 and 10.4% of those age 65 or over.

Politics
Sheridan County voters have selected the Republican County candidate in 80% of the national elections since 1980.

Communities

City
 Plentywood (county seat)

Towns
 Medicine Lake
 Outlook
 Westby

Unincorporated communities

 Coalridge
 Comertown
 Dagmar
 Raymond
 Reserve

Former towns
 Dooley
 Archer

Census-designated places
 Antelope
 Homestead
 Redstone
 Reserve

See also
List of lakes in Sheridan County, Montana
 List of mountains in Sheridan County, Montana
 National Register of Historic Places listings in Sheridan County, Montana

References

External links

 County website

 
1913 establishments in Montana
Populated places established in 1913